Conrad Warner (14 April 1850 – 10 April 1890) was an English international footballer, who played as a goalkeeper.

Career
Born in Cripplegate, Warner played for Upton Park, and earned one cap for England in 1878.

References

1850 births
1890 deaths
English footballers
England international footballers
Upton Park F.C. players
Association football goalkeepers